The positivity effect is the ability to constructively analyze a situation where the desired results are not achieved; but still obtain positive feedback that assists our future progression.

In attribution

The positivity effect as an attribution phenomenon relates to the habits and characteristics of people when evaluating the causes of their behaviors. To positively attribute is to be open to attributing a person’s  inherent disposition as the cause of their positive behaviors, and the situations surrounding them as the potential cause of their negative behaviors.

In perception 
On online social networks like Twitter and Instagram, users prefer to share positive news, and are emotionally affected by positive news more than twice as much as they are by negative news.

According to the research recorded by Dan Zarella, the more positive a person is on social media, the more followers they will get because "users become less engaged when content on their feed becomes more negative" (Lee 1). So, when someone posts a lot of positive things, it makes people want to be a part of their social media presence. People on social media seek out positivity.

See also

 List of biases in judgment and decision making
 List of memory biases
Optimism bias
Pollyanna principle
Positivity offset
Rosy retrospection
 Self-serving bias
 Wishful thinking

Notes

References

Dictionaries and encyclopedias

Papers
 
 
 

Cognition
Cognitive biases
Memory
Memory biases
Psychological theories